The Diocese of Nouakchott is a Latin Church ecclesiastical territory or diocese of the Catholic Church situated in Nouakchott, Mauritania. It is the only Catholic ecclesiastical territory in Mauritania. The Cathedral of St. Joseph is located in Nouakchott.

History
 18 December 1965: Established as Diocese of Nouakchott from the Apostolic Prefecture of Saint-Louis du Sénégal in Senegal

Leadership
 Bishops of Nouakchott
 Archbishop (titular)  Michel-Jules-Joseph-Marie Bernard (died 2 January 1993), C.S.Sp. (15 January 1966 – 21 December 1973)
 Bishop Robert Marie Jean Victor de Chevigny (died 11 June 2011), C.S.Sp. (21 December 1973 – 10 July 1995) 
 Bishop Martin Albert Happe, M. Afr. (since 10 July 1995)

See also
 List of Catholic dioceses in Morocco, Mauretania and Western Sahara
 Catholicism in Mauritania

References

 GCatholic.org
 Catholic Hierarchy

Roman Catholic dioceses in Mauritania
Christian organizations established in 1965
Roman Catholic dioceses and prelatures established in the 20th century